The following is a list of the 15 cantons of the Landes department, in France, following the French canton reorganisation which came into effect in March 2015:

 Adour Armagnac
 Chalosse Tursan
 Côte d'Argent
 Coteau de Chalosse
 Dax-1
 Dax-2
 Grands Lacs
 Haute Lande Armagnac
 Marensin Sud
 Mont-de-Marsan-1
 Mont-de-Marsan-2
 Orthe et Arrigans
 Pays morcenais tarusate
 Pays Tyrossais
 Seignanx

References